KAP7 International, Inc. is an American manufacturer of water polo equipment. Products include sportswear (one-piece swimsuits, swim briefs), other apparel (t-shirts, leggins), and sporting goods (balls, goals).

History
KAP7 was founded in California by Brad Schumacher and Wolf Wigo in 2004. Schumacher is an American competitive swimmer, water polo player, and two-time Olympic champion. Wigo is an American water polo player and three-time Olympian.

Water polo sponsorships
KAP7 has been the official water polo ball provider for the following leagues and associations:

 Americas
 USA Water Polo (USAWP), since 2017, extended in 2021
 National Collegiate Athletic Association (NCAA), since 2011, extended in 2014, 2017 and 2020
 NCAA Men's Water Polo Championship
 NCAA Women's Water Polo Championship

 Europe
 Ligue Européenne de Natation (LEN), since 2017
 European Water Polo Championship
 LEN European U19 Water Polo Championship
 LEN European Junior Water Polo Championship
 LEN Europa Cup
 LEN Champions League
 LEN Euro Cup
 LEN Super Cup
 LEN Euro League Women
 Women's LEN Trophy
 Women's LEN Super Cup

 Oceania
 Water Polo Australia (WPA), since 2018, extended in 2019 and 2020
 Australian Youth Water Polo Championships

References

External links
 

American brands
American companies established in 2004
Manufacturing companies established in 2004
Manufacturing companies based in California
Multinational companies headquartered in the United States
Water polo equipment manufacturers
Sporting goods manufacturers of the United States